The Michigan Court of Appeals is the intermediate-level appellate court of the state of Michigan.  It was created by the Michigan Constitution of 1963, and commenced operations in 1965. Its opinions are reported both in an official publication of the State of Michigan, Michigan Appeals Reports, as well as the unofficial, privately published North Western Reporter, published by West. Appeals from this court's decisions go to the Michigan Supreme Court.

History
The court originally had only nine judges. The number was steadily increased by the Michigan Legislature to accommodate the court's growing caseload—to 12 in 1969, to 18 in 1974, to 24 in 1988, and to 28 in 1993. In 2012, Michigan Governor Rick Snyder signed into law legislation which provided for the transition of each of the court's 4 election districts to 6 judges, which will bring the court back to 24 judges over time through attrition.

Overview

The court has 25 judges who are elected from four electoral districts for 6-year terms on a non-partisan ballot. Vacancies are filled by the governor. Judges or candidates who reach the age of 70 are not allowed to run for election. Cases are heard by panels of 3 judges, similarly to the U.S. Courts of Appeals. Like most appellate courts, the Court of Appeals observes the principle of stare decisis, where a court's reasoning in its past precedents binds its present decisions. When a panel of the court disagrees with a prior precedent, it must abide by the earlier decision in deciding the case at hand. When a panel expresses its disagreement with a prior precedent, there is a mechanism to convene a special 7-member "conflict panel" (similar to the en banc procedure in the U.S. Courts of Appeals) that resolves the conflict between the earlier decision and the expressed desire of a panel of the court's judges to depart from that precedent. Unlike the circuits of the federal courts, the Michigan Court of Appeal's precedents apply are applied statewide regardless of the district in which an opinion is handed down.

Districts
The court has four electoral districts:

1st District is based in Detroit
2nd District is based in Troy
3rd District is based in Grand Rapids
4th District is based in Lansing

Due to the geographic size of the 4th District, the court will, on occasion, schedule a panel to hear cases in a northern Michigan city (such as Marquette, Petoskey, or Traverse City), for the convenience of the parties. The 2nd District does not have its own courtroom.

Each district elects six or seven judges, but the judges on the various panels are not drawn from specific districts. There are also four case filing districts based around geographic proximity to the court's physcial records; because of this, the lines of the electoral districts and case filing districts do not correspond.

Current judges

First district

Second District

Third District

Fourth District

References

External links
Homepage of the Michigan Court of Appeals
History of the court

Michigan state courts
State appellate courts of the United States
Courts and tribunals established in 1963
Legal history of Michigan
1963 establishments in Michigan